This list of humanoid aliens is a collection of various notable extraterrestrial humanoid characters that appear in various works of fiction. Humanoid aliens have traits similar to that of human beings including upright stance, bipedalism, opposable thumbs, facial features, etc.

Animation

Comics

Film

Literature

Television

Video games

References
12.https://thetvdb.com/series/mork-and-mindy

 
humanoid